Language processor may refer to:

 Natural language processor, a computer programmed to process human (natural) languages
 Programming language processor, a computer program which translates a source program written in one programming language to another